This is a list of turnpike roads, built and operated by nonprofit turnpike trusts or private companies in exchange for the privilege of collecting a toll, in the U.S. state of Maryland, mainly in the 19th century. While most of the roads are now maintained as free public roads, some have been abandoned.

See also

References
State laws, accessed via Archives of Maryland Online
Maryland Geological Survey Volume Three, 1899

Turnpikes
Maryland
Turnpikes